An "airport chair" or "airport seating" is a public seating area at an airport. It is normally accompanied by nearby lounges and restaurants.

Robert Sommer studied the design of airport seating and concluded that the arrangement of chairs in rigid lines bolted to the floor was deliberately sociofugal — discouraging any form of social interaction like conversation and encourages them to go to commercial locations such as shops and cafes. The provision of arms on the chairs increased the usage of the chairs, as compared with bench seats without armrests. Strangers are more comfortable sitting adjacent each other if there is an armrest to mark their personal space. The parallel orientation of the modular seat units also minimizes face-to-face contact, making it seem less threatening for strangers.

History 
While designing chairs of the Chicago O’Hare International Airport in 1962, Charles and Ray Eames sought to design a chair that would not only be stylish, but also functional for the people occupying each seat. This seat was later deemed the Eames Tandem Sling Seat. Brian Alexander later updated the Eames seat by adding an occasional table in between seats and power outlets for convenient charging of mobile devices.

Airport terminals designed by major architects such as Renzo Piano (Kansai International Airport) or Richard Rogers (London Heathrow Terminal 5) require high quality seating to match the general quality of their interiors.

Variance in airport lounges  

Seating in airports plays a significant role in the satisfaction of travelling passengers as well as their overall experience in airports. Seating is an important aspect of airports due because it provides both an improved airport experience and visual appeal.

Purpose of seating styles 
The design of the standard airport seating has not seen a significant change in over 50 years, and is known for its simplicity. The primary focus of today’s airport seating is the size and comfort of seating to fit the environment that the airport and airline desire to create.

Since fire safety is a significant consideration at airports, regulations now govern the contents of airport terminals and this affects the choice of materials used for the seating.

Airport lounges provide greater comfort and services to travelers with a membership in a location separate from the standard airport environment. While standard domestic and international airport lounges include basic seating and access to charging stations, these membership-based lounges provide more comfortable and spacious seating.

Primary features of airport lounges include refreshments and bars, entertainment, relaxation, and unique seating styles.

Types of seating 
Dubai International Airport (DXB) provides airline travelers with a premium range of seating material in various colors such as blue, red, black and grey. DXB is an example of an airport that is focused on setting apart standards of original airport seating and experimenting with various colors to enhance appearance and comfort.

Priority Pass is a membership-based lounge access service that caters to airports around the world including Africa, Asia, Continental Europe, Latin America and The Caribbean, Middle East, North America, and the UK. With 25 years of service, Priority Pass provides passengers with elegant seating styles.

The first sleeping pod was introduced in 2013 at Helsinki Airport in Finland. The sleeping pod allowed airline travelers to relax in their own peaceful space. The pod features adjustment to be turned from a seat to a bed, storage area for carry-on luggage, as well as charging connectivity.

Dubai International Airport (DXB) also features sleeping pods that fulfill a similar purpose at their Sleep‘n Fly Lounge.

Comfortability trends 
The environment of airport waiting areas is continuously updated, and revamped to enhance the experience of the traveler. Due to the reinforcement of airport security, the wait time of a passenger has significantly increased. To accommodate customer experience, airports have applied major efforts in increasing comfort in the lobbies/seating areas. The space surrounding the seating area within an airport is designed to encourage comfort, happiness and connectedness within travelers. The level of comfort travelers experience is dependent on a variety of factors.

The six airport servicescape factors are:

 Design
 Scent
 Functional organization
 Air/lighting conditions
 Seating
 Cleanliness

In a study regarding the importance of these factors, it was found that there is a positive correlation between the comfort of the traveler and the scent of the waiting area. A higher level of comfort has encouraged the desire to fly through a specific airline more than once.

Modern technologies 
New styles of seating have been developed to accommodate new technologies. The Ampere modular tandem seating system is designed to allow travelers to use multiple electrical devices while remaining seated in their chair. 

Since business travellers commonly wish to use laptop computers while waiting, seating for them may incorporate a charging point and a some form of desk. 
GoSleep sleeping pods at the Abu Dhabi International Airport allow travelers to sleep during long layovers. The pods include a cover for security and privacy and power outlets for charging electronic devices.

References

Chairs